This page shows the results of the cycling competition at the 2006 Central American and Caribbean Games, held on July 21 and July 22, 2006, in Cartagena, Colombia.

Medal summary

Men's events

Women's events

Medal table

Results

Men's competition

Individual Time Trial (44 km)
Held on 2006-07-21

Individual Road Race (142 km)
Held on 2006-07-22

Women's competition

Individual Time Trial (22 km)
Held on 2006-07-21

Individual Road Race (88 km)
Held on 2006-07-22

References
Results
 

2006 Central American and Caribbean Games
Central American and Caribbean Games
2006
2006 in cycle racing
2006 in track cycling